Renescure is a commune in the Nord department in northern France.

Philippe de Commines (1447–1511) was a writer and diplomat in the courts of Burgundy and France. He was born in Renescure which was then in the county of Flanders. 

It is the village where Bonduelle S.A. opened its first cannery.

Heraldry

See also
Communes of the Nord department

References

Communes of Nord (French department)
French Flanders